Scandiavis is genus of prehistoric birds related to Charadriiformes. It is known from the Fur Formation (Early Eocene) of Denmark.

References

Prehistoric bird genera
Charadriiformes
Eocene birds
Prehistoric birds of Europe
Fossil taxa described in 2013